The Rickettsiales, informally called rickettsias, are an order of small Alphaproteobacteria. They are obligate intracellular parasites, and some are notable pathogens, including Rickettsia, which causes a variety of diseases in humans, and Ehrlichia, which causes diseases in livestock.  Another genus of well-known Rickettsiales is the Wolbachia, which infect about two-thirds of all arthropods and nearly all filarial nematodes. Genetic studies support the endosymbiotic theory according to which mitochondria and related organelles developed from members of this group.

The Rickettsiales are difficult to culture, as they rely on living eukaryotic host cells for their survival.

Rickettsiales phylogeny 
The Rickettsiales further consist of three known families, the Rickettsiaceae, the Midichloriaceae, and the Ehrlichiaceae. Most studies also support the inclusion of the Holosporaceae, but one study has challenged this view. In that alternative, the Holosporaceae are the sole representatives of their own order, the Holosporales, and as such not part of the Rickettsiales (see the schematic tree below). Other lineages, not clearly part of any family, have been described, as well. Examples include Candidatus Arcanobacter lacustris  and Rickettsiales bacterium Ac37b.

Phylogenetic relationship between Rickettsiales and Pelagibacterales (SAR11) 
The phylogenetic relationship between these two groups has yet to reach consensus in the scientific literature.

Early reports suggested that they represented sister clades to each other. However, later studies suggested that this relationship is false and was due to a phylogenetic artefact, which artificially groups independent AT-rich and fast-evolving lineages (Rickettsiales and Pelagibacterales have both properties) together. Upon correcting for this artefact, the Pelagibacterales form a sister clade to the Hyphomicrobiales, Rhodobacterales and Caulobacterales instead.

Another study  adheres to the sister relationship between the two clades (see schematic tree). In their classification, the relation between the two orders is retained in the subclass, the Rickettsidae, which include the Rickettsiales, the Pelagibacteriales, and the extinct protomitochondrion (mitochondria themselves are not bacteria, but organelles).

Reductive evolution 
Rickettsiales genomes are undergoing reductive evolution and are typically small (generally < 1,5 Mbp), AT-rich (generally < 40% GC) with a low coding density (generally < 85%) and a relatively high number of pseudogenes. Reduction in genome size, % GC and coding density and genes are generally attributed to genetic drift and Muller's ratchet. Genetic drift is enhanced in Rickettsiales genomes due to low population sizes (given their endosymbiotic nature) and frequent population bottlenecks. Similarly, Muller's ratchet is activated through the lack of recombination and horizontal gene transfer (the eukaryotic host cell is a natural barrier).

References 
 

 
Alphaproteobacteria